Formosa arctica is a Gram-negative, chemoheterotrophic and strictly aerobic bacterium from the genus Formosa which has been isolated from seawater from the  Arctic Ocean.

References

Flavobacteria
Bacteria described in 2014